Symmetrischema inexpectatum is a moth in the family Gelechiidae. It was described by Povolný in 1967. It is found in North America, where it has been recorded from Texas.

References

Symmetrischema
Moths described in 1967